Agranovich is a Jewish surname that may refer to
Evgeny Agranovich (1918–2010), Russian poet and bard
 Mikhail Agranovich (mathematician) (1931–2017), Russian mathematician
 Mikhail Agranovich (cinematographer) (born 1946), Soviet and Russian cinematographer, director and teacher
 Lev Agranovich (born 1970), Jewish producer and actor, author and accountant
 Sophia Agranovich, Ukrainian-American concert pianist, recording artist and music educator

See also
Agranovich–Dynin formula